The London Green Party is the regional party of the Green Party of England and Wales that operates in Greater London.

Current representatives

London Assembly Members 
 Caroline Russell - Leader of the City Hall Greens
 Siân Berry
 Zack Polanski

Councillors 
As of May 2022, Green Party representation on London Councils are:

Former representatives

Members of the European Parliament 

Jean Lambert (1999–2019)
Scott Ainslie (2019–2020)

Electoral results

United Kingdom general elections 
The table below shows the London Green Party's results at UK general elections since the area of Greater London was created.

Greater London Council elections 
The table below shows the results obtained by the Ecology Party in elections to the Greater London Council. The GLC was abolished by the Local Government Act 1985.

European Parliament elections 
The table below shows the results gained by the London Green Party in elections to the European Parliament. From 1979 to 1994, MEPs were elected from 10 individual constituencies by first-past-the-post; since 1999, MEPs were elected from a London-wide regional list by proportional representation.

London Assembly elections

London Mayoral elections

London Borough Council elections

City of London Corporation elections

The Greens did not field any candidates in the 2022 City of London Corporation election

Candidates for Mayor of London
 2000: Darren Johnson
 2004: Darren Johnson
 2008: Siân Berry
 2012: Jenny Jones
 2016: Siân Berry
2021: Siân Berry
2024: Zoë Garbett

References 

Green Party of England and Wales
Politics of London
Organisations based in the London Borough of Hackney